The Third Perso-Turkic War was the third and final conflict between the Sassanian Empire and the Western Turkic Khaganate. Unlike the previous two wars, it was not fought in Central Asia, but in Transcaucasia. Hostilities were initiated in 627 AD by Tong Yabghu Qaghan of the Western Göktürks and Emperor Heraclius of the Byzantine Empire. Opposing them were the Sassanid Persians, allied with the Avars. The war was fought against the background of the last Byzantine-Sassanid War and served as a prelude to the dramatic events that changed the balance of powers in the Middle East for centuries to come (Battle of Nineveh, Islamic conquest of Persia).

Background 
Following the First Siege of Constantinople by the Avars and Persians, the beleaguered Byzantine Emperor Heraclius found himself politically isolated. He could not rely on the Christian Armenian potentates of Transcaucasia, since they were branded as heretics by the Orthodox Church, and even the king of Iberia preferred to befriend the religiously tolerant Persians. Against this dismal background, he found a natural ally in Tong Yabghu. Earlier in 568, the Turks under Istämi had turned to Byzantium when their relations with Persia soured over commerce issues. Istämi sent an embassy led by the Sogdian diplomat Maniah directly to Constantinople, which arrived in 568 and offered not only silk as a gift to Justin II, but also proposed an alliance against Sassanid Persia. Justin II agreed and sent an embassy to the Turkic Khaganate, ensuring the direct Chinese silk trade desired by the Sogdians.

In 625, Heraclius dispatched to the steppes his emissary, named Andrew, who promised to the Khagan some "staggering riches" in return for military aid. The khagan, on his part, was anxious to secure the Chinese-Byzantine trade along the Silk Route, which had been disrupted by the Persians in the aftermath of the Second Perso-Turkic War. He sent word to the Emperor that "I shall take revenge on your enemies and will come with my valiant troops to your help". A unit of 1,000 horsemen fought their way through Persian Transcaucasia and delivered the Khagan's message to the Byzantine camp in Anatolia.

Siege of Derbent 

Early in 627, the Göktürks and their Khazar allies approached the Caspian Gates at Derbent. This newly built stronghold was the only gate to the fertile land of Aghvania (modern-day Azerbaijan). Lev Gumilev observes that the lightly armed militia of Aghvania was no match against the hordes of heavy cavalry led by Tong Yabghu. His troops stormed Derbent and swarmed over Aghvania, plundering it thoroughly. The fall and sack of Derbent were described in detail by the Armenian historian Movses Kagankatvatsi, thought to have been an eyewitness to the event:

The fall of the fortress that had been considered impregnable sparked panic all over the country. Aghvanian forces withdrew to their capital, Partav, from whence they made for the Caucasus Mountains. The Göktürks and Khazars overtook them near the village of Kalankatuyk, where they were either slain or taken prisoner. The conquerors imposed upon Aghvania a heavy system of taxation, as reported by Movses:

Siege of Tbilisi 

The next objective of the Turkic-Byzantine offensive was the Kingdom of Iberia, whose ruler Stephanus was a tributary to Khosrow II. In the words of Movses Kagankatvatsi, the Khazars "encircled and besieged the famous and great sybaritic trade city of Tbilisi," whereupon they were joined by Emperor Heraclius with his mighty army. 

Heraclius and Tong Yabghu (called Ziebel in the Byzantine sources) met under the walls of Narikala. The yabgu rode up to the emperor, kissed his shoulder and made a bow. In return, Heraclius hugged the barbarian ruler, called him his son, and crowned him with his own diadem. During the ensuing feast the Khazar leaders received ample gifts in the shape of earrings and clothes, while the yabghu was promised the hand of the emperor's daughter, Eudoxia Epiphania.

The siege dragged on without much progress, punctuated by frequent  sallies on the part of the besieged; one of these claimed the life of their king. After two months the Khazars retreated to the steppe, promising to return by the autumn. Tong Yabghu left young Böri Shad, either his son or nephew, in charge of the remaining forty thousand which were to assist Heraclius during the siege. Before long these departed as well, leaving the Byzantines to continue the siege alone and prompting jeers from the besieged.  

When the Georgians ironically referred to the Emperor as "the goat," hinting at his incestuous marriage, Heraclius recalled a passage from the Book of Daniel about the two-horned ram overthrown by the one-horned goat. He interpreted this as a good sign and struck southward against Persia. On 12 December 627 he appeared on the bank of the Tigris and clashed with Persian forces near the ruins of Nineveh. In January he ravaged the environs of the Persian capital Ctesiphon, signaling a sea-change in the Persian-Byzantine relations.

Conclusion 

After the triumph of Heraclius, Tong Yabghu hastened to resume the siege of Tiflis and successfully stormed the city in winter. "With their swords raised, they advanced on the walls, and all this multitude, climbing upon each other's shoulders, rose up the walls. A black shadow fell upon the wobegone citizens; they were vanquished and lost their ground," Movses narrates. Although the Georgians surrendered without further resistance, the city was looted and its citizens were massacred. The Persian governor and the Georgian prince were tortured to death in the presence of Tong Yabghu. 

The Gokturks, renowned for their expertise in hand-to-hand combat, never excelled in siegecraft. For this reason Gumilev attributes the taking of Tiflis to the Khazars. There are good reasons for believing that this success encouraged Tong Yabghu to grander designs. This time he planned to incorporate Aghvania into his khaganate, rather than to wield a usual campaign of plunder. Before returning to Suyab he instructed Böri Shad and his generals to "spare the lives of the rulers and nobles of that land, in as much as they come out to meet my son, surrender to my rule, concede their towns, castles, and trade to my troops". 

These words indicate that Tong Yabghu was eager to retain control of the westernmost portion of the Silk Route, as he tightened his grip of its other segments all the way east to China. In April 630 Böri Shad determined to expand his control of Transcaucasia and sent his general Chorpan Tarkhan with as little as 30,000 cavalry to invade Armenia. Using a characteristic ploy of nomadic warriors, Chorpan Tarkhan ambushed and annihilated a Persian force of 10,000 dispatched by Shahrbaraz to counter the invasion. The Turks knew the Sassanid response would be harsh, and so they plundered cities and withdrew their forces back to the steppes.

See also
 First Perso-Turkic War
 Second Perso-Turkic War
 Byzantine–Sassanid War of 602–628
 Timeline of the Turks (500–1300)

Notes

References
Artamonov, Mikhail. Essays on the Early History of the Khazars (Очерки ранней истории хазар). Leningrad, 1936.
Artamonov, Mikhail. Istoriya Khazar. Leningrad, 1962.
Brook, Kevin Alan. The Jews of Khazaria. 2nd ed. Rowman & Littlefield Publishers, Inc, 2006.
Christian, David. A History of Russia, Mongolia and Central Asia. Blackwell, 1999.
Gibbon, Edward. The History Of The Decline And Fall Of The Roman Empire. London, 1845.
Gumilev, Lev. The ancient Türks (Древние тюрки). Moscow: AST, 2007. .
Movses Kagankatvatsi. История агван Моисея Каганкатваци, писателя X века (trans. and ed. by Patkanov). St. Petersburg, 1861.
Theophanes the Confessor. Летопись византийца Феофана от Диоклетиана... Moscow, 1890.

620s conflicts
Military history of the Göktürks
Turkic War 3
Byzantine–Sasanian War of 602–628
Battles involving the Khazars
Medieval Azerbaijan
7th century in Georgia (country)
620s in the Sasanian Empire
620s in the Byzantine Empire
627
628
629
Wars of Khosrow II